Conklin Airport  was an airport located serving Conklin, Alberta, Canada.

See also
Conklin (Leismer) Airport

References

External links
Place to Fly on COPA's Places to Fly airport directory

Defunct airports in Alberta
Transport in the Regional Municipality of Wood Buffalo